An Introduction to the Theory of Numbers is a classic textbook in the field of number theory, by G. H. Hardy and E. M. Wright.

The book grew out of a series of lectures by Hardy and Wright and was first published in 1938.

The third edition added an elementary proof of the prime number theorem, and the sixth edition added a chapter on elliptic curves.

See also

 List of important publications in mathematics

References

Mathematics textbooks
Number theory
1938 non-fiction books